Alfred Place is a street in Bloomsbury, London, running between Chenies Street and Store Street.

Location

Alfred Place runs from Chenies Street in the north to Store Street in the south. It runs parallel with Ridgmount Street and Tottenham Court Road.

There is a cycle hire point at the south end of the street.

Buildings
The street is home to:
One Alfred Place. A private member's club.
The Residential Property Tribunal for the London area at number 10.
Whittington House, on the north east corner with Chenies Street, designed by architect Richard Seifert who also designed nearby Centre Point in New Oxford Street. According to Ruth Siddall of University College London, the building is "faced with close-fitted, highly polished, black Rustenburg Bon Accord Gabbro from the Bushveld lopolith in the Transvaal, South Africa .... composed of interlocking crystals of white feldspar and black pyroxene."

Inhabitants
The poet Thomas Campbell (1777–1844) lived in Alfred Place in 1837.

Irish dramatist, James Sheridan Knowles (1784–1862), lived at number 29.

References

External links
http://www.british-history.ac.uk/survey-london/vol5/pt2/pp186-187
http://www.ucl.ac.uk/bloomsbury-project/streets/alfred_place.htm
https://web.archive.org/web/20150910040348/http://www.soane.org/collections/architectural_drawings/georgian_regency/town_planning_leasing_layout/3

Streets in the London Borough of Camden